The following is a list of Nippon Professional Baseball players with the last name starting with B, retired or active.

B
Shohei Baba
Toshifumi Baba
Gene Bacque
Cory Bailey
Aarom Baldiris
John Bale
Jeff Ball
Willie Banks
Larry Barnes
Jeff Barry
Adam Bass
Tony Batista
Howard Battle
Jim Baumer
Kevin Beirne
Rigo Beltrán
Sean Bergman
Takehiko Bessho
Rafael Betancourt
Kaoru Betto
Todd Betts
Jason Beverlin
Larry Bigbie
Mike Birkbeck
Don Blasingame
Greg Blosser
Mike Blowers
Hiram Bocachica
Kenmei Boku
Frank Bolick
Rodney Bolton
Koji Bonishi
James Bonnici
Jason Botts
Cedrick Bowers
Shane Bowers
Clete Boyer
Glenn Braggs
Craig Brazell
Brent Brede
Bernardo Brito
Mario Brito
Perez Brito
Chris Brock
Jerry Brooks
Terry Bross
Jamie Brown
Marty Brown
Roosevelt Brown
Cliff Brumbaugh
Ralph Bryant
Brian Buchanan
Scott Bullett
Melvin Bunch
Morgan Burkhart
Adrian Burnside
Terry Burrows

References

External links
Japanese Baseball

 B